Ohaba is a commune located in Alba County, Transylvania, Romania. It is composed of four villages: Colibi (Székás), Măghierat (Magyarádtanya), Ohaba, and Secășel (Szekasbesenyö; Heidendorf).

As of 2011, the commune had a population of 757; of those, 92.73% were ethnic Romanians and 2.51% Roma.

Natives
  (1884–1956), Orthodox cleric, Archbishop of Iași, Metropolitan of Moldavia and Bukovina

References

Communes in Alba County
Localities in Transylvania